Jane Eyre is an opera in three acts, Op. 134, by John Joubert to a libretto by Kenneth Birkin after the 1847 novel by Charlotte Brontë. The opera was written from 1987 until 1997. The world premiere of the revised version took place on 25 October 2016 at the Ruddock Performing Arts Centre in Birmingham, England.

Recording
Jane Eyre, April Fredrick (soprano) as Jane and David Stout (baritone) as Rochester. Somm.

References

1997 operas
Operas based on Jane Eyre
English-language operas
Operas